The Shakedown Original Snowboard Games Since 2002 is a rider-driven snowboard event whose primary goal is to promote snowboarding. Its unique competition format makes the event a laid-back festive gathering that is appreciated by athletes and the fans.

Description 

Since its inception in 2002, Shakedown events have drawn in thousands of fans and athletes worldwide. As of 2010, this internationally notorious snowboarding event has multiplied. In fact, the Shakedown started exporting its unique concept to the United States in 2010/2011 and to Europe in 2011.
 
At the Shakedown, athletes will take part in a slopestyle competition that demands a mastery of two different disciplines: the big air and the rail setup, which features multiple options revealed only on the first day of competition. Though fans revel in the unveiling of the Shakedown’s best-kept secret, it is also highly anticipated by participants, who must adapt their strategies accordingly.
 
Athletes have a set time frame in which to perform their judged runs and must announce them before they are carried out under the watchful eye of industry players and audience members. There is no pre-determined order. Riders perform when they feel ready -a unique competition format appreciated by all those involved. Large purses are awarded to the best athletes.

History

Shakedown 

 2015 : Shakedown
Canada (QC, Mont Saint-Sauveur, Avila section), April 4, 2015
 2014 : Ride Shakedown
Canada (QC, Mont Saint-Sauveur), April 4–5, 2014
 2013 : Ride Shakedown
Canada (QC, Mont Saint-Sauveur), April 5–6, 2013
 2012:  Ride Shakedown
Canada (QC, Mont Saint-Sauveur), March 30–31, 2012
 2011: Ride Shakedown
Europe (Germany, Garmisch-Partenkirchen), March 11–12, 2011
USA (Washington, near Seattle, The Summit at Snoqualmie), March 18–19, 2011
Canada (QC, Mont Saint-Sauveur), April 1–2, 2011
 2010: Ride Shakedown
USA (Washington, near Seattle, The Summit at Snoqualmie), March 12–13, 2010
Canada (QC, Mont Saint-Sauveur), April 2–3, 2010
 2009: Ride Shakedown (Change in title sponsor)
Canada (QC, Mont Saint-Sauveur), April 3–4, 2009

Empire Shakedown 

 2008: Empire Shakedown
Canada (QC, Mont Saint-Sauveur), April 4–5, 2008
 2007: Empire Shakedown
Canada (QC, Mont Saint-Sauveur), April 6–7, 2007
 2006: Empire Shakedown
Canada (QC, Mont Saint-Sauveur), March 24–25, 2006
 2005: Empire Shakedown
Canada (QC, Mont Saint-Sauveur), March 26, 2005
 2004: Empire Shakedown
Canada (QC, Mont Saint-Sauveur), April 3, 2004
 2003: Empire Shakedown
Canada (QC, Mont Saint-Sauveur), March 22, 2003
 2002: Empire Shakedown
Canada (QC, Mont Saint-Sauveur), March 23, 2002

References

1.) http://illicoweb.videotron.com/illicoweb/chaines/Ride-Shakedown/62864/RIDE-Shakedown-10-ans-plus-tard

2.) http://www.cyberpresse.ca/sports/ski-et-surf/201104/03/01-4386008-ride-shakedown-un-3e-titre-pour-sebastien-toutant.php

3.) http://www.snowboardquebec.com/news/2011/ride-shakedown-st-sauveur-2011-informations/

4.) http://snowboarding.transworld.net/1000114710/news/ride-shakedown-coming-to-seattle/

External links 
 Official Website
 Canadian Version
 USA Version

Snowboarding competitions